Cake or Death is the final studio album by Lee Hazlewood, released in 2006. The title of the album is a reference to a stand-up comedy routine by the British comedian Eddie Izzard, of whom Hazlewood was a fan.

Personnel
For his final album, Hazlewood opted to work with lower-profile performers rather than his usual roster of collaborators such as Nancy Sinatra or Ann-Margret. "Please Come to Boston" features Swedish singer Ann-Kristin Hedmark. "She's Gonna Break Some Heart Tonight" was performed solely by Hazlewood's friend Tommy Parsons, with Hazlewood introducing Parsons at the beginning of the track. “The First Song of the Day” was written by German musician Dirk Felsenheimer, better known by his stage name Bela B. The track was also featured on Bela B's album Bingo as “Lee Hazlewood & das erste Lied des Tages.”

Critical reception

Stephen Troussé of Pitchfork gave the album a 7.7 out of 10, saying: "sobriety has never been Hazlewood's style, and Cake or Death is as daffy, cornball and absurdly touching as anything he's put his name to over the last half century." John Bush of AllMusic gave the album 3 stars out of 5, saying: "In sound and execution, Cake or Death is a modern-day roots rock record (with the polished touch of Nashville), and Hazlewood's studio team finds no trouble moving from loping (Western) swing to red-hot rock & roll."

Track listing

References

External links
 
 

2006 albums
Lee Hazlewood albums